Mountain Lake is a city in Cottonwood County, Minnesota, United States. The population was 2,104 at the 2010 census.

Mountain Lake was initially composed mostly of the 1,800 Low German (or more specifically, Plautdietsch) speaking Mennonites from Russia who settled there between 1873 and 1880. Although the city has gradually become more diverse, with the more recent addition of immigrant groups including Lao, Hmong, and Hispanic people, a significant percentage of its inhabitants still have Mennonite surnames.

History
The city of Mountain Lake was formally platted on May 25, 1872.  It has had a post office in operation since 1871.

Original settlement
The name "Mountain Lake" is usually attributed to early settler William Mason.  The city's official website recalls, "the first white settler to the area, William Mason, found a shallow 900-acre lake with three islands.  The two smaller islands just broke the water's surface.  The third much larger, higher island looked to Mason like a mountain rising from the lake.  He named the lake Mountain Lake and the island Mountain Island."  The top of the island was covered with trees, and could be seen for miles around, thus serving as a landmark to early settlers.  The story continues that in 1871 the St. Paul & Sioux City Railway had selected "Midway" as the name of the village, since it was located midway between Saint Paul, Minnesota and Sioux City, Iowa.  However, Mason insisted that the village being platted be named "Mountain Lake".

Demand for more tillable farmland and construction advances led to the draining of the original lake in 1905–1906, which was located in Mountain Lake township, southeast of town.  However, in 1937–1938 a dam, bridge, and outlet were constructed by the Works Progress Administration at a new site in Midway township to create a new Mountain Lake.  This lake, located on the north edge of town, also has an island.

The large island of the original lake – now just a hill amidst the surrounding cornfields – became a county park which has since 1973 been listed on the National Register of Historic Places.  Archeological evidence suggests that early settler William Mason was not the first to appreciate the unique qualities of the original lake's island.  Artifacts unearthed in a 1976 dig indicated evidence of habitation as early as 500 BC, thus making the location the oldest human habitation yet to be discovered in the state of Minnesota.

Mennonite immigration and influence
The coming of the railroad in 1873 played a big role in the expansion of the village.  By the time Mountain Lake was formally incorporated in 1886, it had a population of three hundred people, primarily composed of Mennonites immigrating from southern Russia (present-day Ukraine).

In 1873, Mennonite immigrants from the Ukraine (at that time, Ukraine was part of the Russian Empire) began to arrive in Mountain Lake, having been recruited by William Seeger, a member of the Minnesota State Board of Immigration.  Seeger had specifically targeted Mennonites, “because they were believed to be hard workers of good character.”  The majority of these Mennonite families came from the Molotschna Colony, located near the present-day city of Melitopol, Ukraine.  However, a number of Manitoba Mennonites originally from the Chortitza Colony, near the present-day Ukrainian city of Zaporizhzhia, also settled in the Mountain Lake area.  By 1880, it is estimated that some 295 Mennonite families had settled there.

Because Mountain Lake was already an established community and its surrounding farmland largely surveyed, the Mennonites could not arrange themselves in the traditional communal villages they had been accustomed to in their Ukrainian colonies.  This forced them to adapt to American-style, single family farms and to live amongst their non-Mennonite neighbors.  As settlement continued, the Mennonites of Mountain Lake had soon established a successful and cohesive community, “based primarily on agriculture and local commerce.”  For many decades thereafter, they retained the speaking of Plautdietsch, the Mennonite variation of Low German.

On October 14, 1889, the Konference der Vereinigten Mennoniten-Brueder von Nord America was founded in Mountain Lake.  Elder Aaron Wall, founder of the Bruderthaler Church of Mountain Lake and Elder Isaac Peters of the Ebenezer Church of Henderson, Nebraska were instrumental in the establishment of this new Mennonite denomination.  Known today as the Fellowship of Evangelical Bible Churches (FEBC), for many years the conference was popularly called the Bruderthaler Conference, because of the influential nature of the Mountain Lake founding church.  In 1914 the name was officially changed to The Defenceless Mennonite Brethren in Christ of North America.  The name was changed once again, in 1937, to Evangelical Mennonite Brethren (EMB).  The denominational headquarters was located in Mountain Lake until 1956.

Around the year 1905, several local men founded the Mennonite hospital of Mountain Lake.  The institution struggled until 1912, when it was sold and reorganized as the Bethel Deaconess Hospital.  The physicians in charge were Dr. Piper of Mountain Lake and Dr. Sogge of Windom, who were assisted by three deaconess sisters.  The hospital was managed by a local board of directors consisting of one member from each of the town's five Mennonite churches.

Geography

Minnesota State Highway 60 serves as a main route around the city, running generally east to west.  Secondarily, County Road 1 runs north and south through town.

Mountain Lake is located at coordinates 43°56′20″N 94°55′47″W / (43.9388460, -94.9297089).  The elevation is 1,306 feet (398 m).

Demographics

2010 census
As of the census of 2010, there were 2,104 people, 829 households, and 526 families residing in the city. The racial makeup of the city was 82.8% White, 0.8% African American, 0.2% Native American, 10.3% Asian, 0.1% Pacific Islander, 3.9% from other races, and 1.9% from two or more races. Hispanic or Latino of any race were 10.7% of the population.

There were 829 households, of which 31.4% had children under the age of 18 living with them, 49.9% were married couples living together, 9.4% had a female householder with no husband present, 4.1% had a male householder with no wife present, and 36.6% were non-families. Of all households, 34.0% were made up of individuals, and 18.3% had someone living alone who was 65 years of age or older. The average household size was 2.48 and the average family size was 3.16.

The median age in the city was 39.3 years. 27.6% of residents were under the age of 18; 7.8% were between the ages of 18 and 24; 20.6% were from 25 to 44; 23.1% were from 45 to 64; and 20.7% were 65 years of age or older. The gender makeup of the city was 48.7% male and 51.3% female.

2000 census
As of the census of 2000, there were 2,082 people, 817 households, and 531 families residing in the city. The racial makeup of the city was 84.29% White, 0.58% African American, 0.48% Native American, 6.82% Asian, 0.10% Pacific Islander, 4.27% from other races, and 3.46% from two or more races. Hispanic or Latino of any race were 5.76% of the population.

There were 817 households, out of which 31.0% had children under the age of 18 living with them, 53.0% were married couples living together, 8.9% had a female householder with no husband present, and 35.0% were non-families. Of all households, 32.3% were made up of individuals, and 20.6% had someone living alone who was 65 years of age or older.  The average household size was 2.41 and the average family size was 3.07.

In the city, the population was spread out, with 26.5% under the age of 18, 7.4% from 18 to 24, 22.2% from 25 to 44, 16.5% from 45 to 64, and 27.4% who were 65 years of age or older.  The median age was 40 years. For every 100 females, there were 92.1 males.  For every 100 females age 18 and over, there were 83.5 males.

The median income for a household in the city was $29,146, and the median income for a family was $36,652. Males had a median income of $30,291 versus $17,917 for females. The per capita income for the city was $13,845.  About 8.5% of families and 13.0% of the population were below the poverty line, including 22.2% of those under age 18 and 5.4% of those age 65 or over.

Politics
Mountain Lake is located in Minnesota's 1st congressional district, represented by Jim Hagedorn, a Republican. At the state level, Mountain Lake is located in Senate District 22, represented by Republican Doug Magnus, and in House District 22B, represented by Republican Rod Hamilton.

Gilbert Esau, one of southern Minnesota's longest-serving legislators in state history, made his home in Mountain Lake.  Esau represented Mountain Lake in the Minnesota House for all but four of the years between 1962 and 1982.

Sports

Baseball
Mountain Lake's baseball team (playing as Mountain Lake/Butterfield-Odin) took third place overall in the Minnesota State High School League baseball tournament in 1993.  They shared their third place honors with Sebeka, due to a rain cancellation which precluded the actual playing of the 3rd/4th place game.  The Mt. Lake Area baseball team captured a conference championship in 2014 under head coach Tim Snyder.

Probably Mountain Lake's most decorated baseball player, Grant Wall, appears numerous times in high school and collegiate record books.  Over his Minnesota state high school career (2002 - 2005), he is listed as:  6th overall in career total bases with 219, 8th overall in career runs scored with 122, 8th overall in career on base (H, W, HBP) with 206, and is tied for 4th place in single season doubles, at 15, in 2004.
Wall went on to play NAIA collegiate baseball for Northwestern College (Iowa), where he currently holds the overall record (tie) in single season doubles, at 19 during the 2007 season.  While there, Wall was a two-time Great Plains Athletic Conference (GPAC) 1st Team All-Conference shortstop (2007 and 2008) and was named the GPAC conference player of the year in 2007.

Basketball

The Mountain Lake boys' basketball program has a rich history within Minnesota state high school basketball, making a total of 15 state tournament appearances.  They participated in the state's first-ever basketball tournament, a 13-team, statewide invitational in 1913, hosted at Carleton College in Northfield.  Under coach Henry Griebenow, Mountain Lake narrowly lost to Fosston by a 29 - 27 score in the state's inaugural championship game.  Mountain Lake's Peter Guenter was the first tournament's high scorer, with 71 total points, averaging 17.8 points over the tournament's 4 games.  They were also state runners-up in the 1915 and 1917 tournaments.

Then in 1939, Mountain Lake won the state title in single class competition against Minneapolis Marshall, by a score of 37 – 31 under Coach Ray Bassett.

Minnesota High School Coaches Association Hall of Fame basketball and football coach, Burt A. Munson, guided Mountain Lake boys' basketball teams to four (1946, 1948, 1951, and 1952) state tournament appearances.  Mountain Lake's Burt Munson Field is named in his honor.

The most recent state tournament appearance in 2013 (playing as Mountain Lake Area), was under Head Coach Shawn Naas, assisted by coaches Nate Brinkman, Larry Hempeck, Paul Metcalf, and Steve Thiessen.  Their 2012–13 season record was 24 wins and 6 losses.  On January 10, 2014, Coach Naas achieved his 300th career coaching victory.

2014 graduate Carter Kirk set all time records in Mountain Lake basketball history in points scored (2150) and rebounds (1350).  Kirk went on to play for Southwest Minnesota State University in Marshall, where he holds the school record for total rebounds with 887 and field goal percentage at 0.592.

In total, Mountain Lake has made boys’ state basketball tournament appearances in:  1913 (runner-up), 1914, 1915 (runner-up), 1917 (runner-up), 1922, 1933, 1939 (champion), 1940, 1946, 1947, 1948, 1951, 1952, 2012 (as "MLBO"), and 2013 (as "Mountain Lake Area).  Those 15 appearances put them at 11th overall in total state tournament appearances.  The ten teams that have made more tournament appearances include Austin(29), Bemidji(29), Red Wing(24), Moorhead(23), Hopkins(20), Crosby-Ironton(20), Chisholm(19), DeLaSalle(19), Mpls. North(19), and Mankato(17) - all of which are larger schools.

Cross Country

The Mountain Lake boys team has qualified for the class ‘A’ state cross country meet a total of 4 times:  1976 (4th place), 1978 (8th), and 1979 (6th) under coach Paul Metcalf.  Then in 1991 they made another team appearance, as Mountain Lake/Butterfield-Odin, where they placed 8th overall.

The Mountain Lake girls cross country team qualified to participate in the state class ‘A’ meet a total of 9 times - including 7 consecutive state tournament appearances in the years 1979 through 1985.  They qualified for state competition in the years 1979 (9th place), 1980 (5th), 1981 (3rd), 1982 (8th), 1983 (runner-up), 1984 (7th), and 1985 (10th) under head coach Paul Metcalf.  It would be 22 years after that streak ended before they again qualified for the state tournament – in both 2006 (9th place) and 2009 (3rd) - under the Mountain Lake/Butterfield-Odin banner.

Football
Mountain Lake has made a total of nine Minnesota state high school football tournament appearances, starting in 1980, when they were the state Class 'C' runners-up.  They lost that year in the championship game to Bird Island/Lake Lillian by a 20–7 score.  Playing under the banner of Mountain Lake/Butterfield-Odin, they made state appearances in 1991, 2002, and 2003.  In 2002, they achieved the state runner-up status (in class 'A') for the second time with a 14–7 loss to Rushford-Peterson.

Playing as the Mountain Lake Area (MLA) Wolverines, they made back to back 9 man football state tournament appearances, in 2012 and 2013.  In 2012, the Wolverines lost in the first round to eventual runner-up, Grand Meadow, by a 34 - 20 score.  In 2013, bringing an undefeated 11–0 record to the table, they again faced Grand Meadow in the first round.  This time, they lost 35 - 18 to Grand Meadow, who would go on to become that year's 9 man champions.  The 9 man head coach was Tim Kirk, who was assisted by Tim Snyder, Nate Brinkman, and Jordan Kirk.

MLA again reached the state tournament in back-to-back to back appearances under coach Kirk in 2017, 2018 and 2019.  They first reached the state nine-man football championship, in a game played on November 23, 2018, at U.S. Bank Stadium.  Both MLA and Spring Grove were undefeated in the regular season.  Although the Wolverines lost to Spring Grove by a 40 to 18 score, the team nonetheless notched its third state runners-up honors.  On November 30, 2019, MLA defeated Hancock to win their first nine-man football title.  After falling behind in the first half, the Wolverines, quarterbacked by Abraham Stoesz, scored three unanswered touchdowns to notch a 22–14 victory.  Stoesz was named as a finalist for Minnesota's Mr. Football in 2019.

Mountain Lake's Carter Kirk finished his football career with 7666 all-purpose yards during the 2011 through 2013 seasons.  This feat is listed as fifth in the history of Minnesota high school football.  Kirk went on to play basketball with Southwest Minnesota State University.  On September 16, 2016, Senior quarterback Levi Stoesz set a school record with 333 rushing yards in a 56 - 24 win over Madelia in nine-man football.  Stoesz added four rushing touchdowns plus 121 passing yards and a passing touchdown in the victory.  Stoesz went on to play football with Northwestern College, Orange City Iowa.

Golf

Aaron Walzak made four straight class ‘A’ state individual tournament appearances from 2012(third place), 2013(unknown), 2014(28th place), and 2015(13th place).

Softball
Playing as Mountain Lake/Butterfield-Odin, the Mountain Lake girls' fast-pitch team earned their first-ever berth in the state high school softball tournament in 2001.

Notable people
Silas Bartsch, school administrator
Larry Buhler, football player
George Buhr, coach
Gilbert Esau, politician
Herman Becker Fast, politician
Walter Franz (politician), politician
Rod Hamilton, politician
Orlando J. Heinitz, politician
Chuck Loewen, politician
George W. Olson, politician
Neva Pilgrim, soprano
Samuel J. Schultz, Old Testament scholar
Paul Tewes, political organizer

References

Further reading
 Schultz, Ferdinand Peter. A History of the Settlement of German Mennonites from Russia, at Mountain Lake, Minnesota. MA Thesis, University of Minnesota, 1937.

External links
City of Mountain Lake
Historic photographs
Mountain Lake Public Schools
Mountain Lake Christian School
The Observer / Advocate newspaper site
History of Mountain Lake by John P. Jungas (circa 1970) 
"Mennonites of Mountain Lake" by the Minnesota Historical Society
"A History of the Origin of the Place Names Connected with the Chicago & North Western and Chicago, St. Paul, Minneapolis & Omaha Railways" by Chicago and North Western Railway Company p. 184

Cities in Minnesota
Cities in Cottonwood County, Minnesota
German-Russian culture in the United States
Hmong-American culture in Minnesota
Laotian-American culture
Russian-American culture in Minnesota